Ebblinghem (from Flemish; Ebblingem in modern Dutch spelling) is a commune in the Nord department in northern France.

Ebblinghem is the site of the Ebblinghem Military Cemetery, which contains over 440 graves, most of which are servicemen from Commonwealth countries killed in the First World War.

Population

Heraldry

See also
Communes of the Nord department

References

Communes of Nord (French department)
French Flanders